Drizzlecombe or Thrushelcombe is an area of Dartmoor in the county of Devon, England, containing  a number of Bronze Age stone rows, cairns and menhirs.

There are three principal stone rows each with an associated barrow and terminal menhir. Most of the artifacts are on the southwest slope of Hartor Hill.

Nearby is the large but damaged cairn known as Giant's Basin; many of its stones were removed by warreners to build their rabbit-warrens at Ditsworthy, lower down the river. Higher up the slope and overlooking these monuments is a village of stone hut circles, akin to the one at Grimspound. To the north-east lie the extensive remains of Eylesbarrow tin mine and north-west is the concentric Yellowmead stone circle. The area also includes the Neolithic Dartmoor kistvaens, or tombs.

Notes

References

Bronze Age England
Dartmoor
Archaeological sites in Devon
Bronze Age sites in Devon